Chibueze Christian Simon (born 9 April 2000) is a Nigerian footballer who currently plays as a forward for Fukushima United.

Career statistics

Club

Notes

References

2000 births
Living people
Nigerian footballers
Nigerian expatriate footballers
Association football forwards
J3 League players
Fukushima United FC players
Expatriate footballers in Japan
Nigerian expatriate sportspeople in Japan